The Board of Trustees of the Catholic University of America have the ultimate responsibility for governance and sole responsibility for fiscal affairs of the university.  The bylaws and civil charter limit the board to no more than 50 members, of whom 24 must be clerics. The Archbishop of Washington, who serves as chancellor of the university, and the president of the university serve as ex officio members.  Members serve terms of four years, and typically do not serve more than three consecutive terms. Normally, all the cardinals who serve as bishops of U.S. dioceses are members of the board.

Committees
The executive committee is composed of the chairman of the board, the chancellor, the president, and the chairmen of standing committees on academic affairs, audit, development, finance, student life, trusteeship and university seminary, and three other at-large members elected by the membership. Non-voting membership in certain standing committees is extended to duly appointed members of the administration, faculties, and staffs, to undergraduate and post-baccalaureate students, and to externs.

Members
As of September 2, 2021, the board of trustees at The Catholic University of America was composed of 45 members:

Archbishop Samuel J. Aquila, Denver, Colo.
Richard Banziger, New York, N.Y.
Lawrence J. Blanford, Naples, Fla.
Lee Ann Joiner Brady, Skillman, N.J.
Bishop Michael F. Burbidge, Arlington, Va.
Joseph L. Carlini, Chairman, Malvern, Pa.
Bishop Octavio Cisneros, Brooklyn, N.Y.
William E. Conway Jr., McLean, Va.
Cardinal Blase J. Cupich, Chicago, Ill.
Cardinal Daniel N. DiNardo, Houston, Texas
Cardinal Timothy M. Dolan, New York, N.Y. 
Sister Janet Eisner, S.N.D., Boston, Mass.
Bishop Daniel E. Flores, Brownsville, Texas
John H. Garvey, President, Washington, D.C.
Archbishop Jose H. Gomez, Los Angeles, Calif.
Cardinal Wilton Daniel Gregory, Washington, D.C. (Chancellor of The Catholic University of America)
Frank J. Hanna III, Atlanta, Ga.
Stephen J. Kaneb, South Hampton, N.H.
Archbishop Joseph Edward Kurtz, Louisville, Ky.
Leonard A. Leo, McLean, Va. 
Archbishop William E. Lori, Baltimore, Md.
William P. McInerney, Franklin Lakes, N.J.
Michael J. Millette, New Rochelle, N.Y.
James Moye, Fairfield, Conn.
Mark A. Murray, Grand Rapids, Mich.
Anne E. O'Donnell, M.D., Arlington, Va.
Cardinal Sean P. O'Malley, O.F.M. Cap., Braintree, Mass.
 E. Jeffrey Rossi, Esq., Warren, Ohio
Monsignor Walter R. Rossi, Washington, D.C. (Rector of the Basilica of the National Shrine of the Immaculate Conception)
Catharine Murray Ryan, Pittsburgh, Pa.
Enrique Segura, Washington, D.C.
Victor P. Smith, Esq. Indianapolis, Ind.
Cardinal Joseph W. Tobin, C.Ss.R., Newark, N.J.
Monsignor Peter J. Vaghi, Bethesda, Md.
Michael P. Warsaw, Birmingham, Ala.
Cardinal Donald W. Wuerl,  Washington, D.C.
Lawrence J. Morris, Secretary of the Board, Springfield, Va.

References

Catholic University of America
 
Catholic University of America